Alastair Graeme Lynch (born 19 June 1968) is a former professional Australian rules footballer who played in the Australian Football League (AFL). He is best known as a three-time premiership full-forward for the Brisbane Lions.

The Tasmanian began his career in defence, where he became a club champion and leading goal-kicker for Fitzroy. He represented his home state at the elite level, and at the peak of his career in 1993 he was acknowledged as one of the league's best with All-Australian status. However, he left a financially struggling Fitzroy to become a prize recruit for a new-look Brisbane Bears after the club's move from the Gold Coast. With the merger of his former club Fitzroy and new club Brisbane, Lynch rejoined with former teammates and became club captain.

A long battle with chronic fatigue syndrome threatened his career; however, after many years in absence, Lynch's return to form at a relatively late age in his career was hailed by the football community, and he became part of Brisbane Lions' celebrated premiership winning formula.

Lynch is a Tasmanian football legend, a favourite son at both Fitzroy and Brisbane clubs, and holds the record for the most combined goals for the merged entity and one of the last remaining former Fitzroy players to play in the AFL.

Early life
Lynch was born in Burnie. He attended Burnie High School. He began playing football with Wynyard club where he played in the U17s and U19s before moving to Hobart. In Hobart he played senior football with the Hobart Football Club under coach Peter Hudson.

VFL/AFL career

Fitzroy Lions career (1988–1993)
Selected at pick 50 from the in the 1986 VFL Draft, Lynch began his senior football career at Fitzroy in 1988. He signed his first contract on 5 February. He was an intimidating player in defence, playing full-back and centre half-back. In his early years, his notable abilities were his strong marking (his outstanding aerial abilities were recognised when he won the 1989 Mark of the Year award) and heavy tackling. His titanic battles with key forwards such as Tony Lockett were highlights, and Lockett has commented on Lynch being one of his toughest opponents. In 1993, Fitzroy coach Robert Shaw moved Lynch to full-forward, where he led the club's goal-kicking with 68 goals in addition to winning the best and fairest award. Lynch also played full-back in the 1990 Tasmanian State of Origin team, the first Tasmanian team to defeat Victoria in 30 years.

Brisbane Bears career (1994–1996)
In 1994, Lynch transferred to the Brisbane Bears. At the time, the Brisbane Bears, like the Fitzroy Football Club, were experiencing lean times, but they were improving somewhat under the coaching of premiership coach Robert Walls. The term of Lynch's contract, ten years, was unprecedented; at the time, it was considered by outsiders to be a great risk for the club.

Lynch came full of promise to the Bears. In the early years, he became a poster-boy recruit for the struggling club, which lacked big name players.

In his first few games of the 1994 AFL season, Lynch had suffered a broken collarbone and knee surgery, making him unable deliver his best. In 1995, he contracted a mystery virus (which was later revealed that he was suffering from chronic fatigue syndrome), which sidelined him for the entire 1995 season. Some commentators believe that if Lynch had played that season, the Bears could have won a premiership. Others believed that Lynch contracted chronic fatigue when over-training during his rehabilitation from injury. Lynch was one of the first sportspeople in Australia to experiment with the ice bath, which proved to assist in his recovery, and became a public figure for the illness which was struggling for credibility at the time. After the illness Lynch rarely travelled to Perth, to play the Western Australian teams at home.

In his return the following season, the Bears, struggling for forward-line talent and with an increasingly talented back-line, first experimented playing Lynch up forward to relieve an ageing Roger Merrett with some success. Successive seasons saw him interchanged between the two opposite ends of the ground.

Brisbane Lions career (1997–2004)
When Fitzroy merged with the Bears after the 1996 season to form the Brisbane Lions, Lynch was made a semi-permanent forward but was unable to perform at his peak for the next two seasons due to minor recurrence of his illness.

Lynch was appointed as club co-captain with Michael Voss in 1997, a position that he held until 2000, when Voss assumed the full captaincy.

Still struggling with intermittent lapses of Chronic Fatigue Syndrome in 1998, Lynch discovered that the drug he had been prescribed at the beginning of the season, although with the permission of the Australian Sports Drug Agency (official AFL drug agents), had been added to the IOC list of banned substances. He took it upon himself to alert the AFL and was controversially charged for taking a prohibited substance before eventually being cleared.

A new beginning for Lynch and the Lions came in 1999 under champion coach Leigh Matthews. He played some games in defence but usually at full-forward. Improvements in his strength, kicking for goal, and positioning during marking contests made him one of the most feared forwards in the competition.

The Brisbane Lions enjoyed great success for the 2001, 2002, and 2003 seasons, with Lynch becoming a multiple goal-kicker against the game's most prominent full-backs, including Stephen Silvagni, Matthew Scarlett, and Shane Wakelin from Collingwood, Brisbane's ongoing rivals. In this period, Lynch played in three successive premierships. Lynch was in possession of the ball when the final siren sounded at the 2001 Grand Final to signify the Club's first Premiership in 57 years. He would go on to play a key role in two further Grand Final triumphs. In 2004, he was the competition's oldest player at 36 years of age, and became the last remaining player born in the 1960s to play in the VFL/AFL.

Lynch announced his retirement after Brisbane's loss in the 2004 AFL Grand Final. It was viewed by some as a disappointing end to his career; he injured his quad early in the game, his only statistic for the day was giving away a free kick which led to Port Adelaide's first goal for the match, and he would have missed the first ten matches of 2005 after being reported a record-equalling seven times for exchanging punches in an all-out fight with Port Adelaide's Darryl Wakelin, for which Lynch was also fined $15,000. Lynch has since admitted significant regret about his behaviour in the match.

Lynch would be remembered as a player who overcame great adversity to become one of the premier players with one of the greatest teams the game of Australian rules football has seen.

Statistics

|- style="background-color: #EAEAEA"
! scope="row" style="text-align:center" | 1988
|style="text-align:center;"|
| 11 || 18 || 24 || 16 || 117 || 42 || 159 || 64 || 10 || 1.3 || 0.9 || 6.5 || 2.3 || 8.8 || 3.6 || 0.6 || 0
|-
! scope="row" style="text-align:center" | 1989
|style="text-align:center;"|
| 11 || 18 || 26 || 12 || 138 || 40 || 178 || 79 || 9 || 1.4 || 0.7 || 7.7 || 2.2 || 9.9 || 4.4 || 0.5 || 1
|- style="background-color: #EAEAEA"
! scope="row" style="text-align:center" | 1990
|style="text-align:center;"|
| 11 || 22 || 19 || 34 || 217 || 57 || 274 || 120 || 17 || 0.9 || 1.5 || 9.9 || 2.6 || 12.5 || 5.5 || 0.8 || 0
|-
! scope="row" style="text-align:center" | 1991
|style="text-align:center;"|
| 11 || 22 || 9 || 14 || 215 || 75 || 290 || 88 || 28 || 0.4 || 0.6 || 9.8 || 3.4 || 13.2 || 4.0 || 1.3 || 4
|- style="background-color: #EAEAEA"
! scope="row" style="text-align:center" | 1992
|style="text-align:center;"|
| 11 || 20 || 27 || 13 || 159 || 63 || 222 || 74 || 15 || 1.4 || 0.7 || 8.0 || 3.2 || 11.1 || 3.7 || 0.8 || 2
|-
! scope="row" style="text-align:center" | 1993
|style="text-align:center;"|
| 11 || 20 || 68 || 31 || 260 || 68 || 328 || 143 || 12 || 3.4 || 1.6 || 13.0 || 3.4 || 16.4 || 7.2 || 0.6 || 10
|- style="background-color: #EAEAEA"
! scope="row" style="text-align:center" | 1994
|style="text-align:center;"|
| 11 || 13 || 35 || 22 || 146 || 32 || 178 || 81 || 6 || 2.7 || 1.7 || 11.2 || 2.5 || 13.7 || 6.2 || 0.5 || 7
|-
! scope="row" style="text-align:center" | 1995
|style="text-align:center;"|
| 11 || 1 || 2 || 0 || 6 || 5 || 11 || 5 || 1 || 2.0 || 0.0 || 6.0 || 5.0 || 11.0 || 5.0 || 1.0 || 0
|- style="background-color: #EAEAEA"
! scope="row" style="text-align:center" | 1996
|style="text-align:center;"|
| 11 || 18 || 52 || 34 || 153 || 32 || 185 || 87 || 7 || 2.9 || 1.9 || 8.5 || 1.8 || 10.3 || 4.8 || 0.4 || 2
|-
! scope="row" style="text-align:center" | 1997
|style="text-align:center;"|
| 11 || 20 || 12 || 7 || 155 || 62 || 217 || 89 || 10 || 0.6 || 0.4 || 7.8 || 3.1 || 10.9 || 4.5 || 0.5 || 0
|- style="background-color: #EAEAEA"
! scope="row" style="text-align:center" | 1998
|style="text-align:center;"|
| 11 || 15 || 10 || 7 || 109 || 63 || 172 || 55 || 10 || 0.7 || 0.5 || 7.3 || 4.2 || 11.5 || 3.7 || 0.7 || 0
|-
! scope="row" style="text-align:center" | 1999
|style="text-align:center;"|
| 11 || 17 || 31 || 20 || 99 || 27 || 126 || 63 || 8 || 1.8 || 1.2 || 5.8 || 1.6 || 7.4 || 3.7 || 0.5 || 0
|- style="background-color: #EAEAEA"
! scope="row" style="text-align:center" | 2000
|style="text-align:center;"|
| 11 || 22 || 68 || 25 || 184 || 49 || 233 || 124 || 17 || 3.1 || 1.1 || 8.4 || 2.2 || 10.6 || 5.6 || 0.8 || 3
|-
|style="text-align:center;background:#afe6ba;"|2001†
|style="text-align:center;"|
| 11 || 23 || 58 || 34 || 154 || 59 || 213 || 93 || 18 || 2.5 || 1.5 || 6.7 || 2.6 || 9.3 || 4.0 || 0.8 || 3
|- style="background-color: #EAEAEA"
|style="text-align:center;background:#afe6ba;"|2002†
|style="text-align:center;"|
| 11 || 22 || 74 || 30 || 161 || 42 || 203 || 102 || 14 || 3.4 || 1.4 || 7.3 || 1.9 || 9.2 || 4.6 || 0.6 || 4
|-
|style="text-align:center;background:#afe6ba;"|2003†
|style="text-align:center;"|
| 11 || 22 || 78 || 36 || 161 || 44 || 205 || 101 || 15 || 3.5 || 1.6 || 7.3 || 2.0 || 9.3 || 4.6 || 0.7 || 5
|- style="background-color: #EAEAEA"
! scope="row" style="text-align:center" | 2004
|style="text-align:center;"|
| 11 || 13 || 40 || 22 || 78 || 18 || 96 || 54 || 2 || 3.1 || 1.7 || 6.0 || 1.4 || 7.4 || 4.2 || 0.2 || 2
|- class="sortbottom"
! colspan=3| Career
! 306
! 633
! 357
! 2512
! 778
! 3290
! 1422
! 199
! 2.1
! 1.2
! 8.2
! 2.5
! 10.8
! 4.6
! 0.7
! 43
|}

Post-VFL/AFL career
Following his retirement from playing football, Lynch has commentated for Fox Footy and also been a panelist on Bounce with Jason Dunstall, Danny Frawley and Andrew Gaze. He also co-wrote a book with Peter Blucher titled, "Taking Nothing For Granted", which was released in 2005.

Career highlights

Mark of the Year 1989
All Australian 1993
Fitzroy Best and Fairest 1993
Fitzroy Leading Goalkicker 1993
Brisbane Bears Leading Goalkicker 1996
Brisbane Lions Premiership player 2001, 2002, 2003
Brisbane Lions Leading Goalkicker 2000, 2001, 2002, 2003

References

External links

1968 births
Living people
People with chronic fatigue syndrome
All-Australians (AFL)
Australian rules footballers from Tasmania
Tasmanian State of Origin players
Brisbane Bears players
Brisbane Lions players
Brisbane Lions Premiership players
Fitzroy Football Club players
Mitchell Medal winners
People from Queensland
Brisbane Lions captains
Hobart Football Club players
Doping cases in Australian rules football
Tasmanian Football Hall of Fame inductees
Three-time VFL/AFL Premiership players